Tung may refer to:

People
 Madison Tung, a U.S. Air Force Officer, wrestler, and Rhodes Scholar
 Ho-Pin Tung, a dutch race car driver of Chinese descent.
 Lola Tung, an actress known for her acting debut on drama series The Summer I Turned Pretty

Places
 Tung Fort, a hill fort in Maharashtra, India
 Tung, a village in Bar Kham, Cambodia
 Tung (Mawal), a village in Maharashtra, India
 Tung, Sikkim, a village in India
 Tung, West Bengal, India, on the Darjeeling Himalayan Railway

Other uses
 Vernicia fordii or Tung tree, a deciduous tree native to China
 Tung oil, a furniture finish made from the seeds of the tung tree
 Tung (surname), a Cantonese Romanization of Chinese family names 董, commonly used in Hong Kong
 Tung, the original Webster spelling of tongue
 Tunng, an experimental folk band from the United Kingdom
 Lê Quang Tung (1923–1963), Vietnamese military leader under Ngô Đình Diệm

See also